Bathing Franky is a 2012 Australian film directed by Owen Elliott. The movie was released on 26 May 2012 and centers on a young man struggling to reconnect with his life after being released from prison.

Synopsis
Ex-con Steve (Shaun Goss) is unable to entirely cope with his recent release from prison. He's not able to hold a successful relationship with his girlfriend (Bree Desborough) due to his past interactions with another man in prison. Steve tries to re-integrate into society by taking a job delivering "Meals on Wheels" to various people. Through this job he becomes acquainted with Rodney (Henri Szeps), who cares for his invalid mother (Maria Venuti), and with whom he develops a friendship.

Cast
Jancita Day as Young Franky
Bree Desborough as Susie
Shaun Goss as Steve
Brendan Madigan as Tommy
Alexander Spinks as Bindi
Letitia Sutherland as Donna
Henri Szeps as Rodney
Ben Tranter as Young Vincenzo
Maria Venuti as Franky
Michael Winchester as Raven

Production
Michael Winchester began writing the script over a ten-year period while working as a beef farmer in Australia. Diarmid Heidenreich was initially cast as Steve, but the role later went to Shaun Goss for unspecified reasons. Filming took place in 2009, over a four-week period in New South Wales’ Hunter Valley.

Reception
Reviewers for Urban Cinefile gave positive reviews for Bathing Franky, both praising Venuti's acting.

References

External links
 
 

Australian drama films
2012 drama films
2012 films